Emile Saint-Lot, also Emile Saint-Lôt (Bel-Air, Haiti  11 September 1904 – 17 August 1976  New-York) was a Haitian politician, lawyer, and journalist.

He held several governmental posts, like minister of Education;  Public Health; and Labour (1947), and minister of Labour and Justice (1950).

He served as the first ambassador of Haiti to the United Nations, and a member of the security council responsible for voting on the independence of countries. He  was decisive for the independence of Somalia, Israel, and Libya. As for the latter, he was convinced by Ali Aneizi, member of the Liberation of Libya committee, to vote against , a plan to make the three regions of Libya (Tripolitania, Cyrenaica, Fezzan) under the trusteeship of three countries (Italy, United Kingdom, France respectively). The necessary votes to adopt the  plan was never attained as a result of Saint-Lot voting against it.

Notes

Permanent Representatives of Haiti to the United Nations
1904 births
1976 deaths
People from Port-au-Prince
20th-century Haitian lawyers
Haitian journalists
Government ministers of Haiti
Presidents of the Senate (Haiti)
20th-century journalists